Out to Lunch! is a 1964 album by jazz multi-instrumentalist Eric Dolphy. His only recording on Blue Note as a leader, it was issued as BLP 4163 and BST 84163. Featuring Dolphy in a quintet with trumpeter Freddie Hubbard, vibraphonist Bobby Hutcherson, bassist Richard Davis and drummer Tony Williams, it was generally considered by critics as one of the finest albums issued on Blue Note, and widely viewed as one of the high points of 1960s avant-garde jazz. The album cover designed by Reid Miles features a photo of a "Will Be Back" sign displayed in a shop window showing a seven handed clock.

Background
Dolphy declared "Everyone's a leader in this session", and he was fortunate to be joined by four sympathetic musicians, three of whom had previously performed and recorded with him. Freddie Hubbard had roomed with Dolphy when they both first arrived in New York, and was featured on Outward Bound (1960), Dolphy's first album as a leader. Dolphy and Hubbard also appeared together on Ornette Coleman's 1960 album Free Jazz. Bobby Hutcherson had participated in the July 1963 recording sessions that produced the Dolphy albums Iron Man and Conversations. Dolphy expressed his excitement regarding the opportunity to work with Hutcherson again, stating: "Bobby's vibes have a freer, more open sound than a piano. Pianos seem to control you, Bobby's vibes seems to open you up."

Bassist Richard Davis had also participated in the July 1963 sessions, during which he recorded a number of duets with Dolphy ("Come Sunday", "Ode to Charlie Parker", and "Alone Together"). Davis was also the bassist on Dolphy and Booker Little’s dates At the Five Spot in 1961. One reviewer stated that the pair "had one of the more meaningful connections in jazz; they communicated almost telepathically, as if completing each other's thoughts." Dolphy commented: "Richard doesn't play the usual bass lines. He plays rhythm with his lines. He leads you somewhere else." Drummer Tony Williams, listed as "Anthony Williams" on the album, had turned 18 in December 1963, and was a member of Miles Davis' quintet at the time of the Out to Lunch! recording session. Regarding Williams, Dolphy stated: "Tony doesn't play time, he plays pulse."

Dolphy biographers Vladimir Simosko and Barry Tepperman praised the musical chemistry of this group, observed that "the other musicians match and support [Dolphy's] conception with a truly fantastic sense of freedom and interplay," and writing: "The contributions of the other musicians are potent and striking; the success of the date is to a large degree due to their capacities not only as soloists relating to themes and the other soloists, but in the collective interaction and interplay implicit in Dolphy's conception of the music."

Roughly a month after the Out to Lunch! session, Dolphy, Davis, and Williams participated in the recording of Andrew Hill's album Point of Departure. Beyond that, Dolphy, in the liner notes, stated: "I'm on my way to Europe to live for awhile. Why? Because I can get more work there playing my own music, and because if you try to do anything different in this country, people put you down for it." Dolphy died from a diabetic coma on June 29. He had completed a European tour with Charles Mingus earlier in the year and performed in concerts under his own name.

Music
The title of the album's first track, "Hat and Beard", refers to Thelonious Monk, about whom Dolphy stated: "He's so musical no matter what he's doing, even if he's just walking around." The piece features wild bass clarinet playing, and contains a percussive interlude featuring Williams and Hutcherson. "Something Sweet, Something Tender" also features Dolphy on bass clarinet, and includes a scored duet between Dolphy and Davis on bowed bass. Dolphy commented: "The group got just the lyrical feeling that I wanted, and, taking it out, Richard and I really got together in the unison duet." The third composition, "Gazzelloni", which showcases some of Dolphy's most advanced flute work, was named after classical flautist Severino Gazzelloni, but is actually the album's most conventional, bop-based theme. Dolphy noted: "Everybody holds to the construction for the first 13 bars, then - freedom."

The second side features two long pieces with Dolphy on alto saxophone. On the title track, the pulse is implied rather than being stated explicitly, which lends a sense of freedom. Dolphy commented: "Notice Tony. He doesn't play time, he plays. Even though the rhythm section breaks the time up, there's a basic pulse coming from inside the tune. That's the pulse the musicians have to play." The final track, "Straight Up and Down", was intended to evoke a drunken stagger. Dolphy's solo contains swaggering, voice-like lines on which he employs multiphonics and smears. Regarding the group's contribution, he stated: "It gasses me that everyone was so free. I wanted a free date to begin with. All rhythm sections are different, but this one was really open..."

In late 2013, two previously unissued performances were released on Toshiba EMI TYCJ-81013 in Japan. These are alternate takes of the two bass clarinet tunes "Hat and Beard", and "Something Sweet, Something Tender".

Critical reception

The Penguin Guide to Jazz selected Out to Lunch! as part of its suggested "Core Collection" and awarded it a "crown", stating, "If it is a masterpiece, then it is not so much a flawed as a slightly tentative masterpiece." The album was identified by Chris Kelsey in his AllMusic essay "Free Jazz: A Subjective History" as one of the 20 Essential Free Jazz Albums.

Writer Martin Williams stated that on Out to Lunch!, "we hear a full development of [Dolphy's] talent, in its five, finely crafted compositions, and in his equally well-conceived solos." In a review for AllMusic, Steve Huey described the album as Dolphy's "magnum opus, an absolute pinnacle of avant-garde jazz in any form or era. Its rhythmic complexity was perhaps unrivaled since Dave Brubeck's Time Out, and its five Dolphy originals... were a perfect balance of structured frameworks, carefully calibrated timbres, and generous individual freedom... Just as the title Out to Lunch suggests, this is music that sounds like nothing so much as a mad gleam in its creator's eyes." Writing for The Wire, Brian Morton described Out to Lunch! as "Dolphy's most adventurous album and his most self consistent attempt at freedom within some, at least of the confines established by bop writing," and observed that the group follows what would become "the Weather Report dictum: 'Everyone solos, all of the time'". Morton praised Dolphy's playing, commenting that he was "an 'episodic' player, like an obsessive tale-spinner who shifts from 'reminds me of' to 'and then there was the time when', not quite non sequiturs but not quite obviously connected either. He was an instant composer rather than a strict improviser."

Kevin Whitehead, writing for NPR, referred to Out to Lunch! as Dolphy's "masterpiece", stating: "Half a century later it still sounds crazy in a good way. The organized mayhem starts with Dolphy's tunes, often featuring wide, wide leaps in the melody and ratchet-gear rhythms... He improvised with.. angular energy, and an excitable tone like a goosed goose." He observed: "in time you could hear its influence in Anthony Braxton's or Roscoe Mitchell's zigzag solos and odd timbres, in David Murray's yawping bass clarinet and Jason Adasiewicz's clanking vibes. You can also hear it in ambitious music by all sorts of modern composers who grapple with the same kind of contradictions Dolphy did. Out to Lunch is free and focused, dissonant and catchy, wide open and swinging all at once. Fifty years on, there's plenty there to be inspired by." In an essay for Jazz History Online, Thomas Cunniffe wrote that Out to Lunch! "was an effort to break our expectations about the very nature of jazz", and stated that "In addition to dispelling the notion that improvised solos should maintain the mood of the melody, Dolphy called for his sidemen to rethink their preconceived notions about improvisation", noting that "Dolphy and company re-examined the very framework of this music."

Trevor Maclaren described Out to Lunch! as "one of the finest records of its kind", "easily at the caliber of A Love Supreme and The Shape of Jazz to Come". He stated: "Dolphy shows himself as solid bandleader and arranger who opens up plenty of room of for his players. Much in the ideology of his fellow avant-garde players, the solos exude experiment. Yet Dolphy's control is masterful and no matter how far out he gets, you can feel his passion and know his path has been well articulated." Reviewer Greg Simmons called the album "undeniably brilliant" and "an essential watershed in the jazz canon, representing a creative peak for the soon-to-be-gone Dolphy". He praised Dolphy's bass clarinet playing on the opening track, featuring "a solo from Mars, with serrated, stuttered runs and odd false notes. This is as complete a statement of musical independence—from fashion, commercial concerns, and tradition—as is likely to be found. It's blues from hell, and it sets the pace for the entire record."

In a review for Elsewhere, Graham Reid called Out to Lunch! "undeniably a band album", with the musicians "entirely in sympathy with Dolphy's playing". He continued: "But what this album possesses more than anything else is a confidence and completeness: it is Dolphy as jazz revolutionary who knows the texts from the past but is hearing the space in which he can take the music. The other players were no mere ring-ins for these Blue Note sessions but had worked with Dolphy previously and were conversant with the breadth of his many styles." According to Reid, the album "is as commanding and demanding as it was over four decades ago, which says something about how so many young -- and older -- jazz musicians have retreated from the barricades, and the frontiers that Dolphy saw should be explored as part of the essential contract of jazz."

Track listing
All compositions by Eric Dolphy.

"Hat and Beard" – 8:24
"Something Sweet, Something Tender" – 6:02
"Gazzelloni" – 7:22
"Out to Lunch" – 12:06
"Straight Up and Down" – 8:19

Bonus tracks on 2013 Japanese limited SHM-CD:
"Hat and Beard (alt. take)" – 8:35
"Something Sweet, Something Tender (alt. take)" – 5:42

Personnel
 Eric Dolphy – bass clarinet (1 & 2), flute (3), alto saxophone (4 & 5)
 Freddie Hubbard – trumpet
 Bobby Hutcherson – vibraphone
 Richard Davis – bass
 Tony Williams – drums

References

External links
 

1964 albums
Blue Note Records albums
Eric Dolphy albums
Albums produced by Alfred Lion
Albums recorded at Van Gelder Studio
Avant-garde jazz albums